Cochin Indo-Portuguese, also known as Vypin Indo-Portuguese from its geographic centre, was an Indo-Portuguese creole formerly spoken on the Malabar coast of India, particularly in Fort Cochin, in the state of Kerala. The last fluent speaker, William Rozario, died in 2010. It is now spoken only by a few Christian families on Vypeen Island (Vypin Island), though not fluently.

History
Cochin Indo-Portuguese, known locally as "Portuguese" or "Cochin Portuguese", formed from contact between Portuguese, Malayalam and other languages spoken in old Cochin. Cochin was one of the first contact languages to spring up from European contact in Asia, and it became the mother tongue of part of the local Catholic community in the 15th to 19th centuries. It emerged from Catholic Indo-Portuguese households in Malabar, and it became sufficiently established that it continued under German occupation in the 17th century.  Speakers started shifting away from the language around the turn of the 19th century.  The last native speaker, William Rozario, died on 20 August 2010 in Vypeen. Some in Cochin still understand it to a degree.

Sample Text

Portuguese and Malayalam Influence 
Both Portuguese and Malayalam have had significant influences in Malabar Indo-Portuguese. The verb tæ, for example, borrows its semantic context from other Portuguese verbs, namely from the verbs ter (have) and estar (be). Conversely, the verb's morphosyntactic and semantic constructions were influenced greatly by Malayalam.

References 

Portuguese-based pidgins and creoles
Portuguese diaspora in Asia
Extinct languages of Asia
Languages extinct in the 2010s
2010 disestablishments in India
Portuguese language in Asia